Għar ix-Xiħ (English: Cave of the Old Man or Cave of the Sheikh or The headman's abode) is a former cave in Xewkija, facing Mġarr ix-Xini, Gozo, Malta.  It was inhabited since the 2nd-century B.C. and was re-discovered in 2009. The cave is situated at the mouth of the valley.

The cave was long believed a legend, going back to 1583, about a popular judge who used the cave. Another nearby cave is known as il-Ħabs (The Prison).

The cave floor contained artefacts dating from Bronze Age to late Roman times. At some point the roof was removed.

Further reading
Superintendence

References

External links
 Ghar ix-Xih (Gozo) excavation project
 UOM Ghar ix-Xih Excavations 2007

Caves of Malta
Xewkija
Sannat
Għajnsielem